Deborah Ann Wilcox, Baroness Wilcox of Newport (born 15 June 1957) is a Welsh Labour councillor, and former teacher, who had served from May 2016 until September 2019 as Leader of Newport City Council. She is also head of the Welsh Local Government Association, a role she has held since 2017.

In September 2019, it was announced that she would be made a Labour life peer in the 2019 Prime Minister's Resignation Honours and would be stepping down as Council Leader.

Early life 
Wilcox was born in the Rhondda valley, and brought up in Pontygwaith. She studied for a BEd Drama and Education at the Central School of Speech and Drama between 1975 and 1979, followed by a MA in Media Studies at University of Wales, Cardiff between 1994 and 1997.

Teaching career 
She began her career as a teacher, initially at Hawthorn High School as well as spells teaching in the Newport area for 30 years including at Hartridge High School, Duffryn High School, and Maindee Primary School.

Political career 
In 2004 she was appointed Cabinet Member for Education and Young People, a role she held until 2016, as well as a former Cabinet Member for Leisure and Culture.

In 2016 she was appointed as the first female Leader of Newport City Council, replacing the outgoing Bob Bright.

In 2017 she became the first female Leader of the Welsh Local Government Association, succeeding Cllr Bob Wellington OBE, the former leader of Torfaen County Borough Council.

As part of her new role, Wilcox spoke to BBC Wales to criticise the "abuse of councillors on social media" prompted by reactions to cuts to public services. She stated that, while councillors should be open to fair criticism and scrutiny, the situation was "becoming unsafe". It came after Bridgend County Borough Councillor Sadie Vidal was told she "would be torn apart by fox hounds" and Flintshire County Council Deputy Leader Bernie Attridge was threatened along with his children after the closure of John Summers High School in the area in 2015. The WLGA stated it is looking at ways to "protect councillors from online and face-to-face abuse, including potential legislation."

Wilcox announced her candidacy in the 2018 Welsh Labour Party deputy leadership election, but withdrew in favor of Julie Morgan.

In 2018, she became a fellow of the Royal Society of Arts.

In 2019 she was criticised by Conservative councillors for spending £11,397 on "chauffeur driven cars" out of a total Council budget of £81,415 on such vehicles.

Having been announced as a life peer, in September 2019, Wilcox informed a meeting of the full council that she would be stepping down as Council Leader, at least in the short term, in order to focus on her role in the Lords.

House of Lords
In September 2019, it was announced that she would be made a Labour life peer in the 2019 Prime Minister's Resignation Honours. She is referred to widely as Baroness Wilcox, but takes the exact name, style and title of Baroness Wilcox of Newport. On 4 November 2019, she was introduced to the House. Since 2 March 2020, she has served as an opposition whip.

Personal life 
Wilcox is openly gay, and was shortlisted by Pride Cymru/Wales Online's Pinc List which "recognises the most influential LGBT+ people in Wales". She was an advocate for the repeal of Section 28, a statute forbidding the promotion of homosexuality by local government and maintained schools. The statute was repealed in September 2003 by the Local Government Act 2003.

References

Living people
People from Rhondda
Alumni of the Royal Central School of Speech and Drama
Alumni of the University of Wales
Women councillors in Wales
Welsh Labour politicians
Welsh educators
Leaders of local authorities of Wales
1957 births
Labour Party (UK) life peers
Lesbian politicians
Welsh LGBT politicians
LGBT life peers
Life peeresses created by Elizabeth II